James Devitt (11 October 1921 – 20 November 1988) was an Irish hurler who played as a right corner-back for the Tipperary senior team. 

Devitt joined the team during the 1945 championship and was a regular member of the starting fifteen until his retirement after the 1950 championship. During that time he won one All-Ireland medal, one Munster medal and one National Hurling League medal. At club level Devitt enjoyed a lengthy career with Cashel King Cormacs GAA.

References

1921 births
1988 deaths
All-Ireland Senior Hurling Championship winners
Cashel King Cormac's hurlers
Munster inter-provincial hurlers
Tipperary inter-county hurlers